Astyliasula major is a species of praying mantis in the family Hymenopodidae.

References

Hestiasula
Insects described in 1929